Syarhey Volkaw (born 27 January 1999) is a Belarusian footballer who plays for BATE Borisov.

Career

Club
On 15 July 2020 Volkaw signed a contract with BATE Borisov, which will become effective on 1 January 2021, allowing the player to finish 2020 season in Vitebsk.

International
Volkaw earned his first cap for the national team of his country on 26 February 2020, coming on as a substitute in the 1:0 away win over Bulgaria in a friendly match.

Honours
BATE Borisov
Belarusian Cup winner: 2020–21

References

External links

1999 births
Living people
People from Polotsk
Sportspeople from Vitebsk Region
Belarusian footballers
Association football midfielders
Belarus international footballers
FC Vitebsk players
FC Orsha players
FC BATE Borisov players